The A7 is a motorway (German: Autobahn) which runs from Winterthur in northeastern Switzerland through to Kreuzlingen, a border town with Konstanz (Germany).

The A7 is fully motorway and is relatively devoid of either traffic jams or, indeed, traffic at all. The A7 leaves Winterthur at the Attikon interchange, heading slightly north before turning northeast and continuing onto the capital of the canton of Thurgau, Frauenfeld.

The A7 next connects to another interchange at Grüneck. Before the A7 was completed in full to Kreuzlingen, the A7 would continue from the Müllheim exit through to Eschikofen. That road is now the A23.

The portion of the A7 after Grüneck (heading northeast) is nearly devoid of car park areas, service areas, or even exits. No exit, in fact, would link with the motorway until Kreuzlingen. Meanwhile, the motorway runs through a few tunnels, including a rather long and winding tunnel just before its terminus in Kreuzlingen.

A rarely seen motorway/main road roundabout in Kreuzlingen marks the end of the toll section of the A7. Heading north, the customs area with Kreuzlingen marks the final end of the A7 motorway.

Main route: Winterthur - Frauenfeld - Grüneck - Kreuzlingen - border with Konstanz (Germany)

Speed limit: 120 km/h (75 mph) nearly throughout.

Tolls: Covered by CHF 40 annual motorway toll sticker (Vignette). (Does not apply for short section just south of Konstanz/Kreuzlingen border crossing, north of Kreuzlingen roundabout.)

A07